Cheikh El Khalil Moulaye Ahmed (born 4 December 1987), more commonly known as Bessam, is a Mauritanian professional footballer who most recently played for FC Nouadhibou. He also plays for the Mauritania national team.

Career

ACS Ksar 
Bessam started his career with the club ASC Ksar until he was called to represent the national team by the "then" coach Patrice Neveu. He scored on his first game with the national team, and made an assist in the 2–0 win over Senegal that Qualified the Mauritanian team to the 2014 African Nations Championship in South Africa.

JS Kabylie
In May 2014, Bessam signed a two-year contract with Algerian club JS Kabylie. On August 16, he made his JS Kabylie debut, away to MC Oran, scoring the second goal in a 2–0 victory.
He scored the first goal for Mauritania in a 2–0 victory over Senegal

International career
Bessam started his successful national career by helping his country to qualify to the 2014 African Nations Championship in South Africa where they were disqualified from the groups stage.

International goals
Scores and results list Mauritania's goal tally first.

References

External links
 
 

1987 births
Living people
Mauritania international footballers
Mauritanian expatriate footballers
Mauritanian footballers
Expatriate footballers in Algeria
Expatriate footballers in Saudi Arabia
Expatriate footballers in Tunisia
Expatriate footballers in Lebanon
JS Kabylie players
CS Constantine players
Al Ansar FC players
Al-Ahli SC (Tripoli) players
FC Nouadhibou players
AS Gabès players
Khaleej FC players
Algerian Ligue Professionnelle 1 players
Lebanese Premier League players
Tunisian Ligue Professionnelle 1 players
Saudi First Division League players
Mauritanian expatriate sportspeople in Algeria
Mauritanian expatriate sportspeople in Tunisia
Mauritanian expatriate sportspeople in Saudi Arabia
People from Tiris Zemmour Region
Association football forwards
2019 Africa Cup of Nations players
Libyan Premier League players
Mauritanian expatriate sportspeople in Lebanon
Mauritanian expatriate sportspeople in Libya
Expatriate footballers in Libya
Mauritania A' international footballers
2014 African Nations Championship players
2018 African Nations Championship players
2022 African Nations Championship players